Scleria bracteata, the bracted nutrush, is a plant in the family Cyperaceae. It grows as a perennial climber.

Distribution and habitat
Scleria bracteata grows widely in Mexico, Central America and tropical South America. It is considered a species of least concern on the IUCN Red List due to its broad range. Its habitat includes wet forest, bush savanna, and riparian areas.

References

bracteata
Flora of Mexico
Flora of Central America
Flora of northern South America
Flora of western South America
Flora of Brazil
Plants described in 1799
Taxa named by Antonio José Cavanilles